Cayuga Lake State Park is a  state park located on the north end of Cayuga Lake, east of the village of Seneca Falls in Seneca County, New York, United States.

Park description 
Cayuga Lake State Park offers a beach, two playgrounds, playing fields, picnic tables and pavilions, recreation programs, a nature trail, showers, fishing, a boat launch, a dump station, cabins with view of the lake, a vacation rental, campground for tents and trailers, sledding, cross-country skiing and ice fishing.

The park is situated along New York State Route 89. The road splits the park in half, with electric sites being in the East camp closer to the lake, while nonelectric sites are located in the West camp.

See also 
 List of New York state parks

References

External links 
 New York State Parks: Cayuga Lake State Park

State parks of New York (state)
Parks in Seneca County, New York